Zoltán Friedmanszky (22 October 1934 – 31 March 2022) was a Hungarian footballer who played as a forward. He was a member of the Hungary national team at the 1958 FIFA World Cup. However, he was never capped for the national team. He also played for Ferencváros.

References

External links
 FIFA profile

1934 births
2022 deaths
Hungarian people of German descent
Sportspeople from Borsod-Abaúj-Zemplén County
Hungarian footballers
Association football forwards
1958 FIFA World Cup players
Ferencvárosi TC footballers
Hungarian football managers
Ferencvárosi TC managers